Orpheus and Apollo is a 1962 sculpture by Richard Lippold. It was created for display in Philharmonic Hall (now David Geffen Hall) in Lincoln Center.

It was removed in 2014.

It will be redisplayed at La Guardia airport. The redisplay was the idea of architecture critic Paul Goldberger.

References

Lincoln Center
1962 sculptures